The 1987 Maui Invitational Tournament was an early-season college basketball tournament that was played, for the 4th time, from November 27 to November 29, 1987. The tournament, which began in 1984, was part of the 1987-88 NCAA Division I men's basketball season.  The tournament was played at the Lahaina Civic Center in Maui, Hawaiiand was won by the Iowa Hawkeyes. It was the first title for the program and its head coach Tom Davis.

Bracket

References

Maui Invitational Tournament
Maui Invitational